Sigma Aurigae, Latinized from σ Aurigae, is a giant star in the northern constellation of Auriga. It is faintly visible to the naked eye with an apparent visual magnitude of 4.99. With an annual parallax shift of 6.21 mas, it is approximately  distant from the Earth. This is an evolved giant star with a stellar classification of K4 III.

Sigma Aurigae has a 12th magnitude companion at an angular separation of 8 arcseconds, as well as two fainter companions at 28 and 35" respectively.  All are background objects, stars much further away than Sigma itself.

References

External links
 HR 1773
 CCDM J05247+3723
 Image Sigma Aurigae

035186
Double stars
025292
Aurigae, Sigma
Auriga (constellation)
K-type giants
Aurigae, 21
1773
Durchmusterung objects